David Rowley (born 6 February 1990), is a professional footballer who plays as an defensive midfielder for Malaysia Super League club Sri Pahang. Born in Australia, he plays for the Malaysia national team.

Club career

Wynnum District SC 
David Rowley began his career at Wynnum District Soccer Club in 2007/08.

Taringa Rovers 
In 2008/09 he joined Taringa Rovers, making 17 league appearances.

Eastern Suburbs 
Rowley joined Eastern Suburbs FC in 2009/10.

Pine Hills FC 
In 2009/10 he joined Pine Hills FC, making 17 league appearances.

Brisbane City 
In 2010/11 he joined Brisbane City FC, making 40 league appearances and scoring 5 goals.

Chumphon 
Rowley moved to Chumphon FC in February 2013 signing for the Thai division 2 team. After the first leg, they were sitting in 2nd place equal on 19 points with the 1st place Nara united.

Nara United 
Rowley moved to Nara United in June 2013 and with them became champions of the league by finishing 1st in the Regional League Division 2 Southern Region. During this season they only lost once in 20 games. ยะลาทรุดหนักหวังแค่เสมอ ปัตตานีตั้งเป้าลุ้นแบ่งแต้ม

Grevenmacher 
In July 2014 he joined CS Grevenmacher in the Luxembourg 1st division, making 6 league appearances. He also scored 2 goals in the Luxembourg Cup against Hesperange in the Round of 16.

Inter Leipzig 
Rowley moved to FC International Leipzig in July 2015. He finished the season with 28 appearances and 7 goals.  His team achieved a 2nd place finish in the NOFV- Oberliga Süd.

TeBe Berlin 
In 2015/16 he joined Tennis Borussia Berlin, making 18 league appearances and scoring 4 goals.

Negeri Sembilan
On 12 May 2018, Rowley agreed to join Malaysia Super League side Negeri Sembilan but managed just one league appearance for the club. His playing time at Negeri was short due to a knee injury that sidelined him for the majority of his stay at the club.

Kelantan
On 28 January 2019, Rowley signed a one-year contract with Malaysia Premier League side Kelantan, making 9 league appearances. During the mid-season window Rowley was offered by a number of Malaysian Super League clubs a contract and in the end decided to join Kedah Fa.

Kedah

In May 2019 Rowley signed for Kedah on a 6 month deal. On 27 July, Rowley went on to win the 2019 Malaysian Fa cup 1-0 in extra time in front of 83,520 fans against Perak.

As a result of winning the Fa cup Kedah qualified for the Asian Champions League qualifiers in 2020.

On 25 September 2019 Rowley scored his first goal for Kedah in the 1st leg of the Quarter final of the Malaysian cup away to PKNP.  It was also the winning goal sealing a 1-2 victory.

On the return leg Rowley scored again in the 72nd minute and Kedah produced a convincing 4-1 win to book a place in the semi final of the Malaysia Cup.

On 2 November 2019, Kedah ended up as runners up in the Malaysian cup final after losing to Johor Darul Ta'zim at the bukit Jalil stadium in front of 85,420 fans.

At the end of 2019 Kedah finished in 4th place in the Malaysian Super League and Rowley penned a 1 year extension on his contract.

In 2020, Rowley played an Asian Champions league Qualifier against Seoul Fc at the World Cup Stadium in South Korea.

In 2020, Rowley helped Kedah achieve a 2nd place in the Super League. During his time at Kedah, Rowley managed to make a total of 20 appearances for Kedah in all competitions scoring 2 goals.

Penang
On 13 January 2021, Rowley signed with newly promoted Malaysia Super League side Penang. Rowley scored on his debut against Kuala Lumpur in the 29th minute and the team went on to win 1 nil. Rowley managed 25 appearances and 3 goals in all competitions helping Penang to achieve 3rd place in the Super League. It was also the best result for a newly promoted team ever in the Malaysian Super League.

Sri Pahang
In 2022, Rowley completed a move to Malaysia Super League side Sri Pahang. He finished the season with 18 league appearances and 6 goals.

Personal life
Rowley was born in Australia to an Australian father and Malaysian Chinese mother from Tanjong Keling, Malacca.

Career statistics

Club

Honours

Club
Kedah 
 Malaysia FA Cup: 2019
 Malaysia Cup runners-up: 2019

Nara Utd 
 Regional League South Division: 2013

References

External links

1990 births
Living people
Malaysian footballers
Malaysia international footballers
Australian soccer players
Malaysian people of Australian descent
Australian people of Malaysian descent
Association football midfielders
Australian expatriate soccer players
Negeri Sembilan FA players